The Water Agencies (Powers) Act 1984, previously known as the Water Authority Act 1984, is an act of the Western Australian Parliament that provided for the development, protection and monitoring of water resources, mainly through the establishment of the Water Authority of Western Australia.

References

Further reading
 Water Authority of Western Australia.(1987) The 1986/87 re-organisation / the Water Authority of Western Australia. Leederville, W.A.: The Authority.  (appendices).  (summary)
 Western Australia. Steering Committee for the Merger of State Water Authorities. (1984) Report of the Steering Committee for the Merger of State Water Authorities. Perth, W.A. The Committee. 

Western Australia legislation
1984 in Australian law
Water in Australia
1980s in Western Australia